Omicron Velorum (ο Vel, ο Velorum) is a star in the constellation Vela.  It is the brightest member of the loose naked eye open cluster IC 2391, also known as the ο Velorum Cluster.

Omicron Velorum is a blue-white B-type star with a mean apparent magnitude of +3.60.  It is probably a main sequence object, but has also been classified as a subgiant or giant.  It is approximately 495 light years from Earth. A slowly pulsating B star, it ranges between magnitudes 3.57 and 3.63 over 2.8 days.

The correct Bayer designation for ο Velorum has been debated. Lacaille assigned one Greek letter sequence for the bright stars of Argo Navis. These Lacaille designations are now shared across the three modern constellations of Carina, Puppis, and Vela so that the same Greek letter is not usually found in more than one of the three. However, ο (omicron) is commonly used for stars in both Vela and Puppis. Some authors contend that Lacaille actually assigned a Latin lower case 'o' to this star, while others suggest that ο Puppis should actually be a lower case 'o'.  In the Coelum Australe Stelliferum itself, this star is labelled ο (omicron) Argus (du Navire in the French edition), while ο Puppis is labelled (Latin) o Argus in puppi (Pouppe du Navire in the French edition).

References

Velorum, Omicron
B-type main-sequence stars
074195
042536
Slowly pulsating B stars
Vela (constellation)
3447
PD-52 01583